Raghnall Ó Floinn FSA is an Irish art historian and former director of the National Museum of Ireland (NMI), who joined its staff in 1976 and becoming its director in 2013.

Ó Floinn studied at University College Dublin, attaining a MA in Celtic Archaeology in 1976, and joined the NMI that year as Assistant Keeper in the Irish Antiquities Division. He has published a wide variety of books and papers on bog bodies, the archeology of the early Irish church, and Insular art (particularly metalwork). He co-authored an overview of the museum's collection with his predecessor as NMI director, Pat Wallace.

He has also acted as chairman of the Council of National Cultural Institutions, and a vice-chairman of the Society for Medieval Archaeology, London.

Selected publications

Books 
 "Viking Graves and Grave-Goods in Ireland (Medieval Dublin Excavations 1962-81, Series B)" (2015). 
 "Irish Shrines and Reliquaries of the Middle Ages (Irish treasures)" (2014). 
 "Franciscan Faith: Sacred Art in Ireland, AD 1600-1750" (2011). 
 "Treasures of the National Museum of Ireland: Irish Antiquities" (2002). Co-author with Patrick Wallace.

Monographs
 "The 'Shannon' shrine: a suggested provenance" (2015)
 "	An Anglo-Saxon Disc-Brooch From Sjerring, Jutland" (2013)
 "Ireland and Scandinavia in the Early Viking Age" (1998)
 "A Fragmentary House-Shaped Shrine from Clonard, Co. Meath". The Journal of Irish Archaeology, volume. 5, 1989/1990
 "In Ireland and Insular Art A.D. 500–1200". Proceedings of a Conference at University College Cork, 31 October–3 November 1985. Royal Irish Academy

References

Sources
 Ó Floinn, Raghnal; Wallace, Patrick (eds). Treasures of the National Museum of Ireland: Irish Antiquities. National Museum of Ireland, 2002.

External links
 The National Museum of Ireland - cultural tourism for all - video interview with Dr. Ó Floinn

Living people
Year of birth missing (living people)
Irish art historians
People associated with the National Museum of Ireland